The 2009 Euroseries 3000 began on 16 May at the Autódromo Internacional do Algarve in Portugal and finished at Monza in Italy on 18 October after 14 races.

In February, 2009, series organisers Coloni Motorsport announced that the first-generation A1 Grand Prix chassis, the Lola B05/52, would be introduced into the championship to replace the previous Lola B02/50 model. It was also announced that online gambling site PartyPoker.com became the title sponsor of the series for the next three years.

As a result of the sponsorship deal, the winner of the drivers' championship won a free season in the GP2 Series for 2010. It also allowed them to participate in the 2009–10 GP2 Asia Series and their official testing sessions on 23 and 24 October, less than a week after winning this title. Will Bratt claimed that honour, after his second place in the final race broke a tie with Marco Bonanomi as both drivers finished level on points and victories.

Teams and drivers

† FMS International became Coloni Motorsport prior to round three in Zolder.
‡ Teamcraft Motorsport were taken over in the series by Team Costa Rica prior to round three in Zolder.

Race calendar
Rounds denoted with a blue background are a part of the Italian Formula 3000 Championship.

Championship Standings
 Points for both championships were awarded as follows:

In addition:
 One point was awarded for Pole position for Race One
 One point was awarded for fastest lap in each race

Drivers

F3000 Italian Championship

Teams

References

External links
Official Euroseries 3000 site

Auto GP
Euroseries 3000
Euroseries 3000